The American Economic Liberties Project (AELP) is an American non-profit organization that advocates corporate accountability legislation and aggressive enforcement of antitrust regulations.

History and leadership 
The AELP was founded in February 2020 and is led by Sarah Miller, a former Department of the Treasury official. The AELP is funded in part by the Omidyar Network which is funded by French-born Iranian billionaire Pierre Omidyar.

Activities 
The organization praised the nominations of Lina Khan to serve on the Federal Trade Commission (FTC) and of Jonathan Kanter to serve as Assistant Attorney General for the Antitrust Division.

References

External links
Official website

Non-profit organizations based in Virginia
2020 establishments in Virginia